Ballinora or Ballynora is a small rural parish and townland near Cork city and Ballincollig in County Cork, Ireland. The townland is home to several education facilities and sporting clubs, and includes the village of Waterfall.

Amenities 
Ballinora is home to Ballinora National School, Ballinora and Ballymaw GAA grounds, a community hall, scout den, a pub and a garden centre.

Religion 
Ballinora's Parish church is St. James' Church, which church underwent a major renovation in 2009.

Ballinora is the birthplace of Bishop Cornelius Lucey (1902–1982).

Sport

The local GAA club, Ballinora GAA, was founded in 1924. The club's colours are green and red, and it fields hurling and Gaelic football teams in the Muskerry division of Cork GAA. Ballinora GAA has two sports grounds; Ballinora GAA Pitch (adjacent to the school), and Ballymaw (a rented field).

Richmond FC is the local association football (soccer) club. Founded in 1980, the club owns two pitches, Ballyhank pitch in Waterfall and Garranedarra in Bishopstown. Former Republic of Ireland soccer international, Alan Bennett began his football career with the club.

References

External links 
 http://www.ballinora.com
 http://www.ballinoragaa.ie

Civil parishes of County Cork
Towns and villages in County Cork